This is a list of civil parishes in the ceremonial county of Buckinghamshire, England. There are 221 civil parishes.

Buckinghamshire (unitary authority area)
Part of the former High Wycombe Municipal Borough is unparished.
Population figures are unavailable for some of the smallest parishes.

Milton Keynes
The whole of the borough is parished.

Notes
 Formerly Amersham Rural District
 Formerly Aylesbury Municipal Borough: unparished area 1974-2001 
 Formerly Aylesbury Rural District
 Formerly Beaconsfield Urban District
 Formerly Bletchley Urban District
 Formerly Buckingham Municipal Borough
 Formerly Buckingham Rural District
 Formerly Chesham Urban District
 Formerly Eton Rural District
 Formerly High Wycombe Municipal Borough
 Formerly Marlow Urban District
 Formerly Newport Pagnell Rural District
 Formerly Newport Pagnell Urban District
 Formerly Wing Rural District
 Formerly Winslow Rural District
 Formerly Wolverton Urban District
 Formerly Wycombe Rural District

References

See also
 List of civil parishes in England

External links
 Office for National Statistics : Geographical Area Listings
Aylesbury Vale District Council : Contact Details for Parish Councils and Meetings
Chiltern District Council : Local Parish Councils
Parish Councils in Milton Keynes Borough Council : Links to Parish and Town Councils
South Bucks District Council : Parish Council Members
Wycombe District Council : Parish Councils
Map of ancient parishes in Buckinghamshire

 
Buckinghamshire